Athuru Mithuru is a preschool education paper in Sri Lanka which prints in Sinhala language monthly. Athuru Mithuru is the most popular preschool education paper in Sri Lanka which runs according to the pre-school curriculum.
It is published by the Associated Newspapers of Ceylon Limited (Lake House), a government-owned company. 
The education paper commenced publishing on 1 May 2012. Athuru Mithuru is written as a tabloid size, with colourful drawings. It includes preschool activities, drawings, poems, stories and competitions.

The current editor-in-chief of the paper is Anoma Gangoda while Gunapala Jayalath is the sub-editor. The circulation is close to 100,000 and sales are managed by Dinesh De Alwis. Athuru Mithuru is distributed to the entire island by the Lake House Circulation Department headed by Sunil Sendanayake.

References

External links
Athuru Mithuru-Lake House

2012 establishments in Sri Lanka
Children's magazines
Magazines established in 2012
Monthly magazines
Magazines published in Sri Lanka
Education magazines